Perfume is a 2019 South Korean television series starring Shin Sung-rok, Ha Jae-sook, Go Won-hee, Cha Ye-ryun and Kim Min-kyu. It aired on KBS2 from June 3 to July 23, 2019.

Synopsis
Min Jae-hee is a middle-aged housewife, who is furious at the world due to her appearance and her husband's affair with a younger woman. She attempts to commit suicide but stops when she receives a magic perfume from a delivery man which makes her young and pretty after using the perfume. She starts working as a model under the name Min Ye-rin and meets Seo Yi-do, a successful fashion designer with multiple allergies and fears.

Cast

Main
 Shin Sung-rok as Seo Yi-do
Choi Seung-hoon as young Yi-do
 Ha Jae-sook as Min Jae-hee 
 Go Won-hee as Min Ye-rin
Cha Ye-ryun as Han Ji-na
 Kim Min-kyu as Yoon Min-seok

Supporting
 Yeon Min-ji as Song Min-hee
 Kim Jin-kyung as Kim Jin-kyung (daughter)
 Shin Hye-jeong as Son Mi-yu

Production
 Go Joon-hee was first cast as Min Ye-rin, but she withdrew from the series due to emotional stress caused by her being falsely implicated in the Burning Sun scandal.
 The male lead role was offered to Eric Mun, but he declined.

Viewership

Awards and nominations

Notes

References

External links
  
 
 

Korean Broadcasting System television dramas
Korean-language television shows
2019 South Korean television series debuts
2019 South Korean television series endings
South Korean romantic comedy television series
South Korean fantasy television series